József Varró (born 2 March 1944) is a Hungarian equestrian. He competed at the 1972 Summer Olympics and the 1980 Summer Olympics.

References

External links
 

1944 births
Living people
Hungarian male equestrians
Olympic equestrians of Hungary
Equestrians at the 1972 Summer Olympics
Equestrians at the 1980 Summer Olympics
Sportspeople from Pest County